C. B. King may refer to:

 Chevene Bowers King (1923–1988), African American attorney and civil rights leader
 C. B. King (Surveyor General), Surveyor General of Sri Lanka, 1951–1954
 Charles Brady King, automotive pioneer, engineer and inventor